Quime is a small town in the La Paz Department in Bolivia situated southeast of the city of La Paz at the Khatu River. It is the seat of the Quime Municipality located in the Inquisivi Province.

The town lies between the mountains and the tropics. It has a large vegetation, mostly eucalyptus.

Religion
70% of the population are Christian Catholics, 20% Christians Protestants, and 10% other.  They usually go to church on Sundays.  There is an annual party in honor to Apostle Santiago.

Economy
Quime's economy is based on agriculture and the extraction of minerals.

Agriculture: mostly the production of potatoes, corn, tomatoes, carrots, eucalyptus.

Minerals: these are some of the minerals you can find in the region:

Antimony, Pyrrhotite, Quartz, Scheelite, Siderite, Sphalerite, Tourmaline, Tungstite, Valentinite, Vivianite, Wolfram, Apatite, Arsenopyrite, Calcite, Chalcopyrite, Ferberite, Muscovite, Pyrite

Education
There is a private and public school with grades from K-12. The name of the middle school is Teodomiro Urquiola; the name of the High school is National Mixto Quime. Most of the students from the other regions of the provincia Inquisivi are obliged to go to the High School National Quime because it is one of the best in the region.

Sports
The most common sports are soccer, racquetball, football, tennis, and basketball.

References

External links
 
 National Institute of Statistic in Bolivia: Quime Municipality: population data and map

Populated places in La Paz Department (Bolivia)